Frank Walker may refer to:

 Frank Arneil Walker (active from 2002), Scottish architectural academic and writer
 Frank Buckley Walker (1889–1963), American talent agent
 Frank C. Walker (1886–1959), chairman of the Democratic National Committee
 Frank R. Walker (1899–1976), American admiral during World War II
 Frank T.O. Walker (1878–1904), Philippine–American War Medal of Honor recipient
 Frank Walker (American football) (born 1981), American football cornerback
 Frank Walker (Australian author) (born 1954), Australian journalist and non-fiction writer
 Frank Walker (Australian journalist) (1919–2008), Australian journalist and non-fiction writer
 Frank Walker (Australian politician) (1942–2012), member of the Australian House of Representatives and Member of the New South Wales Legislative Assembly
 Frank Walker (Australian rules footballer) (born 1933), Australian rules footballer for Perth Football Club and Western Australia
 Frank Walker (Scottish footballer) (1897–1949), Scottish footballer with Third Lanark, Scotland
 Frank Walker (baseball) (1894–1974), Major League Baseball outfielder
 Frank Walker (Jersey politician), former Chief Minister of the States of Jersey
 Frank Walker (rugby league), rugby league footballer of the 1930s and 1940s
 Frank X Walker (born 1961), American poet
 Frank Ray Walker, architect, partner in the firm of Walker and Weeks
 Frank Walker (lumberman) (1843–1916), lumberman, contractor and builder
 Frank Walker (musician), Canadian EDM DJ

See also
 Francis Walker (disambiguation)
 Frank Welker (born 1946), American actor and voice actor